Neohesperilla xiphiphora, the xiphiphora skipper, is a butterfly of the family Hesperiidae. It is found in the Northern Territory and Cape York of Australia.

The wingspan is about 30 mm.

The larvae feed on Schizachyrium perplexum.

External links
 Australian Caterpillars

Trapezitinae
Butterflies described in 1911